Diarsia canescens is a moth of the family Noctuidae. It is found from southern
Siberia and Mongolia to the Ussuri region and Sachalin to the east and from the Kurili Islands through China to the southern Himalayas, Taiwan and northern Indochina to the south. It has recently been recorded from Syria.

The wingspan is 38–45 mm.

References

Moths described in 1878
Diarsia
Moths of Asia
Moths of Japan